Labyrinth 2 is a game developed by Illusion Labs for the iPod Touch, iPhone, Android, and Labyrinth 2 HD for the iPad.  Labyrinth 2 utilizes the iPhone's tilt recognition as with most other labyrinth games for the iPhone at the time. However, Labyrinth 2 adds many new elements to its gameplay, such as bumpers, cannons, slingshots, duplicators and many more. Players of the original Labyrinth could play five Labyrinth 2 style levels, even in the free lite edition.

Level editor
Labyrinth 2 allows the player to create their own levels through an online level editor. Levels created in the level editor by other players can be downloaded.

Reception 
Labyrinth 2 received positive reviews. TouchArcade rated the game 4.5 out of 5 stars, praising the game's level editor. Metacritic gave the game a score of 89 out of 100 based on reviews from 8 critics, indicating "generally favorable reviews".

References 

2009 video games
Android (operating system) games
Action video games
IOS games
Maze games
Multiplayer and single-player video games
Video games developed in Sweden